The Cranfield Icefalls are a series of about eight spectacular icefalls, in an east–west line, falling steeply from Bucknell Ridge into the narrowest portion of Darwin Glacier near its mouth. The feature was named by the Darwin Glacier Party of the Commonwealth Trans-Antarctic Expedition (1956–58) for W.J. Cranfield, a member of the party.

References
 

Icefalls of Oates Land